A special election was held in  on July 9, 1792 to fill a vacancy caused by the House Committee on Elections finding on March 21, 1792 that electoral fraud had been involved in Anthony Wayne's election in 1791.  His election was declared void and he was removed from the House.

Election results 

Milledge took his seat on November 22, 1792

See also 
 1792 and 1793 United States House of Representatives elections
 List of United States representatives from Georgia

References 

13th congressional district special election
Georgia 01
1792 01 special
Georgia 1792 01
Georgia 1792 01
United States House of Representatives 1792 01